Kaymaklı is a village in the central district of Hakkâri Province in Turkey. The village had a population of 170 in 2022.

The hamlet of Sütlüce is attached to Kaymaklı.

History 
The village was populated by 20 Assyrian families in 1850 and 5 families in 1877.

Population 
Population history from 2000 to 2022:

References 

Villages in Hakkâri District
Kurdish settlements in Hakkâri Province
Historic Assyrian communities in Turkey